Philip Nicholson  may refer to:

 Philip Nicholson (cricketer) (born 1973), English cricketer
 A. J. Quinnell, the pen name of the English thriller novelist Philip Nicholson
 Phil Nicholson (born 1951), Australian astronomer